ʻAbd al-Bāqī (ALA-LC romanization of ) is a male Muslim given name. It is built from the Arabic words ʻabd and al-Bāqī, one of the names of God in the Qur'an, which give rise to the Muslim theophoric names. It means "servant of the Everlasting".

It may refer to:
Abd al-Baqi, Muhammad Fu'ad (1882–1967), Egyptian Qur'an and hadith scholar.
Abd-al-Baqi al-Zurqani (1611–1688) Egyptian Islamic scholar.
Abdelbaki Hermassi (born 1937), Tunisian politician.
Abdelbaki Sahraoui (1910–1995), Algerian politician.
Abdul Bagi Baryal, Afghan politician.
Abdul Baqi Jammoh (1924–2016), Jordanian politician.
Abdul Baqi Turkistani, Afghan politician.
Abdul Baqi (cricketer), Afghan cricketer.
Abdul Baqi (Pakistani politician) (1939–2001), politician in North West Frontier Province, Pakistan.
Abdulbagi Ali oglu Zulalov, known as Bulbuljan (1841–1927), Azerbaijani singer.
Mahmud Abdülbâkî, pen name Bâkî (1526–1600), Turkish poet
 Maulvi or Mullah Abdul Baqi (Taliban governor) (born 1962), former Taliban governor, diplomat, and cabinet member.
Nashwan Abdulrazaq Abdulbaqi, known as Abdul Hadi al Iraqi (born 1961), Iraqi Kurd held in Guantanamo.
Sabit Damulla Abdulbaki (1883–1934), Prime Minister of the Turkish Islamic Republic of East Turkestan.

References

Arabic masculine given names
Turkish masculine given names